Scott Alexander Jamieson (born 13 October 1988) is an Australian soccer player who plays as a left back and captains for Melbourne City in the A-League.

Club career

Blacktown City
Jamieson was born in Auburn, Sydney. He has previously played for the Blacktown City in the New South Wales Premier League and has also attended Westfields Sports High School before signing for English Premier League side Bolton Wanderers. In the summer of 2007 he made an appearance for Wanderers in their pre-season defeat against Hibernian.

Adelaide United
He ended a three-year stint in England with Bolton on 6 June by signing for Adelaide United on a two-year deal. He made his first A-League appearance for Adelaide in the season opener on 17 August 2008 where he played a full game at left back. Since his first game Jamieson has become a mainstay in the United backline contributing significantly in attack and from set plays. Jamieson was named man of the match for his performance in the Club World Cup game against Waitakere United on 11 December 2008. Jamieson capped off what was a terrific A-League debut season picking up the Rising Star Player of the Year award beating the likes of Michael Zullo, James Holland and Tarek Elrich.

Before the start of the 2009–10 A-League season, Jamieson was linked with moves to several Dutch Eredivisie clubs, but declined all offers and stated his preference in staying in Australia for another season.

After the end of the 2009–10 A-League season, he trialled with German second division club Greuther Fürth. Unfortunately the trial was unsuccessful and he returned to Australia undecided on his next move.

Sydney FC
On 21 May 2010 he was signed to a two-year contract by Sydney FC. Jamieson scored his first goal in the A-League against North Queensland Fury on 14 August 2010 with an unmarked header late in the game.

Perth Glory
He was released from Sydney FC after his 2-year contract was not renewed. He announced via his Twitter, that he was moving to Western Australia to play for Perth Glory.

Western Sydney Wanderers
After 3 seasons in Perth, Jamieson signed with Western Sydney Wanderers on 28 May 2015. In his first season with the club, Jamieson was named in the PFA Team of the Year.

IFK Göteborg
In August 2016, Jamieson joined Swedish club IFK Göteborg.

Melbourne City

2017–2018: Return to Australia and City debut
The following year Scott returned to Australia for personal reasons and signed for Melbourne City on 26 September 2017 for a four-year contract. Jamieson had his decision to chose on joining Melbourne City for the better chance to win his first domestic trophy in his career. He made his debut for Melbourne City on 1 August 2017 in the FFA Cup against Peninsula Power in a 2–0 win.

2018–2019: Assuming the captaincy
As Jamieson finished his first season with Melbourne City in 2017–18; On 13 October 2018 he was awarded to be the club's team captain to start the 2018–19 A-League season, replacing the captaincy for Michael Jakobsen.

2019–2020: Third season and NSW ditch
After it was announced by Football Federation Australia that the remainder of the 2019–20 A-League season from 24 March 2020 would be played in a New South Wales hub, Jamieson had decided on 17 August to return to Melbourne for the birth of his first child to his partner Vicky. and give his captaincy to Josh Brillante for the rest of the A-League campaign.

2020–2021: Record appearance-maker and double
On 22 May 2021, he earned a starting line-up role to give Melbourne City them and his first ever domestic league trophy by securing the A-League Premiership by winning 1–0 against the Central Coast Mariners. Jamieson officially became Melbourne City's all-time appearance maker with 104 appearances in Melbourne City's home semi-final on 20 June 2021 overtaking David Williams. A week later, he captained Melbourne City in their first A-League Championship by winning 3–1 against Sydney FC in the 2021 scored City's second goal to put City into the lead by a penalty.

International career
He has represented Australia at U-17 level and was a member of Australia's squad for the 2005 FIFA U-17 World Championship.

After a string of impressive performances for Adelaide, Jamieson was called into  Pim Verbeek's training squad for the match against Qatar in October 2008. Jamieson was once again selected in the Australian squad for an Asian cup qualifying match against Indonesia on 28 January 2009, where he played his first full international for the Australian national team.

Career statistics

Club

Notes

International

Honours
Melbourne City
 A-League Premiership: 2020–21
 A-League Championship: 2021

Individual
 A-League Young Player of the Year: 2008–09
 Rising Star Award: 2008–09
 PFA A-League Team of the Season: 2014–15, 2015–16, 2020–21

References

External links
 Westeren Sydney Wanderers profile
 

1988 births
Living people
Australian expatriate sportspeople in England
Australian people of Scottish descent
Australian soccer players
Australian expatriate soccer players
Blacktown City FC players
Bolton Wanderers F.C. players
Adelaide United FC players
Australia international soccer players
Sydney FC players
Perth Glory FC players
Western Sydney Wanderers FC players
IFK Göteborg players
Melbourne City FC players
A-League Men players
Allsvenskan players
Expatriate footballers in Sweden
Association football defenders